Dierama pulcherrimum, angel's fishing rod, is a species of flowering plant in the iris family Iridaceae, native to South Africa.

It was introduced to British gardeners in 1866 by the Yorkshire botanist James Backhouse. Common names include angel's fishing rod, hair bell, and wand flower. It is hardy but requires a sheltered position in full sun.

The Latin specific epithet pulcherrimum means "most beautiful".

References

Bulb - Anna Pavord. Great Britain: Mitchell Beazley, an imprint of Octopus Publishing Group Ltd. (2009).

pulcherrimum
Endemic flora of South Africa
Taxa named by Joseph Dalton Hooker
Taxa named by John Gilbert Baker